Michael Troy Afenir (born September 21, 1963) is a former Major League Baseball catcher.

College and minor league career

Drafted by the Houston Astros in the 1st round of the 1983 MLB amateur draft, Afenir made his major league debut with the Houston Astros on September 14, 1987, a win over the Dodgers.  Afenir entered the game in the top of the 9th inning as a pinch hitter for catcher Ronn Reynolds and was struck out by Dodgers hurler Brian Holton.  Afenir did not play in the major leagues in 1988, batting .247 in 137 games for Houston's Double-A affiliate.

Afenir would remain with the Astros until April 6, 1989, when he was traded to the Oakland Athletics for fellow catcher Matt Sinatro.  Afenir spent 1989 in the minor leagues, and returned to the major leagues on July 6, 1990 in the first game of a doubleheader with the Cleveland Indians. THrough the end of the 1990 baseball season, Afenir had struck out 18 times in 34 at bats and had yet to draw a walk. 

Afenir would remain with the Athletics through the 1991 season, after which he became a free agent, and signed with the Cincinnati Reds.  Afenir would appear in 16 games for the Reds during the 1992 season, and finished his career after 84 minor league games in 1993.

Afenir made only one error in 129 chances for a .992 fielding percentage in limited duty at the major league level. Though he hit .239 with 117 home runs during his ten-year minor league career, he hit .190 with no home runs in 79 major league at bats.

Afenir attended Palomar College, and is one of four alumni to have played in the major leagues.

In 2009, he came back to Palomar's baseball team as an assistant coach. His nephew Ty Afenir also attended Palomar and started at shortstop his freshman year, and later transferred to Division I University of Washington.

References

External links

Baseball Gauge
Retrosheet

1963 births
Living people
Asheville Tourists players
Auburn Astros players
Baseball players from California
Cincinnati Reds players
Columbus Astros players
Gulf Coast Astros players
Houston Astros players
Huntsville Stars players
Indianapolis Indians players
Leones del Caracas players
American expatriate baseball players in Venezuela
Major League Baseball catchers
Nashville Sounds players
New York Yankees scouts
Oakland Athletics players
Osceola Astros players
Sportspeople from Escondido, California
Tacoma Tigers players
Palomar Comets baseball players